Antonio José Brack Egg (3 June 1940 – 30 December 2014) was an agronomist engineer, an ecologist, and researcher. He was the first Peruvian Minister of the Environment. He is a national and international authority on issues pertaining to biological diversity and biocommercial development. He died after a brief hospitalization in 2014.

Brack's Andes frog (Phrynopus bracki), a tiny frog occurring in the Yanachaga–Chemillén National Park that Brack help to establish, is named in his honor.

Bibliography
 El ambiente en que vivimos (1975)
 Desarrollo sostenido de la selva : un manual técnico para promotores y extensionistas Perú (1990)
 La sierra del Perú: pobreza y posibilidades (1994)
 Amazonía: desarrollo y sustentabilidad (1994–1995)
 Gran geografía del Perú: naturaleza y hombre (1996)
 Kuntursuyu: el territorio del condor (1996)
 Uturunkusuyo: el territorio del jaguar (1996)
 Pobreza y manejo adecuado de los recursos en la Amazonía peruana: respuesta (1997)
 Amazonía peruana comunidades indígenas, conocimientos y tierras tituladas: atlas y base de datos (1997)
 Dinámicas territoriales: afirmación de las ciudades intermedias y surgimiento de los espacios locales (1999)
 Diccionario enciclopédico de las plantas útiles del Perú (1999), Centro Bartolomé de Las Casas, 
 Biodiversidad y ambiente en el Perú (2000)
 El medio ambiente en el Perú (2000)
 Ecología del Perú (2000)
 Perú maravilloso (2002)
 Legado del Perú andino (2002)
 Perú: diez mil años de domesticación - plantas y animales domésticados - láminas didácticas (2003)
 Perú: diez mil años de domesticación (2003)
 Perú: País de bosques (incluyen fotografías hechas por el autor) (2009)

References

External links

1940 births
2014 deaths
Peruvian people of German descent
Peruvian Ministers of the Environment
People from Pasco Region
University of Würzburg alumni